Hashkiveinu is the second blessing following the Shema during Maariv. It is a petitionary prayer to be able to lie down in peace at night and to return to life the following day.

Shabbat/Yom Tov version
On weekdays, this prayer ends with the words Shomer Amo Yisrael L'Ad. This is seen as appropriate for weekdays, when men go in and out in their weekday pursuits, and come in need of divine protection.

On Shabbat and Yom Tov, a longer version of this blessing is recited. The blessing is ended with the words Who spreads the shelter of peace upon us, upon all of his people Israel, and upon Jerusalem. The words And spread over us the shelter of Your peace that are normally recited earlier in the paragraph are repeated prior to the closing. This is a reflection of the peace that comes along with these special days, and that putting Jerusalem above everything else is important.

In the Babylonian rite, they always recited Shomer Amo Yisrael L'Ad even on the Sabbath, and in the Land of Israel they always recited the longer version even on weekdays.  The contemporary custom, which has been adopted in virtually all communities, is a compromise.

Text
The prayer's text, in each of the Hebrew script, Hebrew as transliterated into the Roman alphabet, and English:

Lay us down,  God, in peace, and raise us up again, our King, to [new] life.
Spread over us Your tabernacle of peace,
And guide us with Your good counsel.
Save us for Your name's sake.
Shield us from every enemy, plague, sword, famine, and sorrow.
Remove the adversary from before and behind us.
Shelter us in the shadow of Your wings,
Guard (our going out and our coming in, and grant us life) and peace, now and always.

Blessed are You, who spreads Your tabernacle of peace over us,
And over all His people Israel and over Jerusalem.

There may be slight differences, depending which nusach (regional liturgical rite) one follows.

References

Maariv
Hebrew words and phrases in Jewish prayers and blessings